Hervé Granger-Veyron (born 11 January 1958) is a French fencer. He won a silver medal in the team sabre at the 1984 Summer Olympics and a bronze in the same event at the 1992 Summer Olympics.

References

External links
 

1958 births
Living people
People from Talence
French male sabre fencers
Olympic fencers of France
Fencers at the 1984 Summer Olympics
Fencers at the 1992 Summer Olympics
Olympic silver medalists for France
Olympic bronze medalists for France
Olympic medalists in fencing
Medalists at the 1984 Summer Olympics
Medalists at the 1992 Summer Olympics
Sportspeople from Gironde
20th-century French people
21st-century French people